Stine Aagaard Bonde (born 2 June 1988) is a Danish handball player who currently plays for Silkeborg-Voel KFUM.

References

1988 births
Living people
Danish female handball players
Sportspeople from the Capital Region of Denmark